Osmonds is the third album released by the Osmonds, the first under MGM as the Osmonds and the first to feature Donny. The first single from the album, "One Bad Apple", became a number-one hit according to the Billboard Hot 100 singles chart.  The second single from the album, "Sweet and Innocent", reached number seven, with the single sleeve crediting group member Donny Osmond as the artist. The album reached number 14 on the Billboard Top Lps chart on February 27, 1971.  It was certified Gold by the RIAA on September 13, 1971.

Critical reception

Dave Thompson of AllMusic criticised the album's "Motown medley that contrarily ranks among the least soulful excursions you could imagine" and said that the album "nevertheless finds them [the Osmonds] still putting performance ahead of personality, and barely hinting at the heights they would soon be scaling".

Track listing

Personnel
Bob Wray - bass
Albert S. Lowe, Jr., Travis Wammack - guitar
Leo LeBlanc - steel guitar
Clayton Ivey - keyboards
Fred L. Prouty - drums
Ronnie Eades - baritone saxophone
Harvey Thompson - tenor saxophone
Dale Quillen - trombone
Harrison Calloway, Jr., Jack Peck - trumpet
Recording dates
"Think" recorded on November 10, 1970
"One Bad Apple" recorded on October 26, 1970
"Catch Me Baby" recorded on November 10, 1970
"Lonesome They Call Me, Lonesome I Am" recorded on November 10, 1970
"Motown Special" recorded on November 13, 1970
"Sweet and Innocent" recorded on November 10, 1970
"He Ain't Heavy, He's My Brother" recorded on November 10, 1970
"Find'em, Fool'em, Forget'em" recorded on November 10, 1970
"Most of All" recorded on November 10, 1970
"Flirtin'" recorded on October 26, 1970

Charts

Certifications

References

1970 albums
The Osmonds albums
Albums arranged by Jimmie Haskell
MGM Records albums